The rivière des Orignaux (in English: Mooses River) crosses the municipality of Notre-Dame-Auxiliatrice-de-Buckland, in the Bellechasse Regional County Municipality, in the administrative region of Chaudière-Appalaches, in Quebec, in Canada.

Rivière des Orignaux is a tributary of the southwest bank of the rivière de la Fourche, which flows northward to empty onto the south bank of the rivière du Sud (Montmagny); the latter flows northwest, then northeast to the south shore of the St. Lawrence River.

Geography 
The main neighboring watersheds of the Des Orignaux river are:
 North side: rivière de la Fourche, South stream, rivière du Sud (Montmagny);
 East side: rivière de la Fourche;
 South side: rivière des Mornes, Belles Amours stream;
 West side: rivière du Moulin, rivière aux Billots.

The Rivière des Orignaux has its source in the township of Buckland, in the municipality of Notre-Dame-Auxiliatrice-de-Buckland, in the Bellechasse Regional County Municipality. The surrounding mountains are part of the Notre Dame Mountains chain.

  northeasterly in Notre-Dame-Auxiliatrice-de-Buckland, to chemin du rang Saint-Roch (route 279);
  northeasterly, to rang Ville-Marie road;
  towards the northeast, up to its confluence.

The confluence of the Rivière des Orignaux is located on the southwest bank of the Forks River, in the township of Buckland.

Toponymy 
The toponym “rivière des Orignaux” was made official on September 11, 1987, at the Commission de toponymie du Québec.

See also 

 List of rivers of Quebec

References 

Rivers of Chaudière-Appalaches
Bellechasse Regional County Municipality